Nissewaard is a municipality in the Netherlands, located on the island of Voorne-Putten, in the south of the province of South Holland. It was created through a merger of the municipalities of Spijkenisse and Bernisse on 1 January 2015.

Nissewaard  has a population of about 85,000 as of 2014.

Topography

Dutch topographic map of the municipality of Nissewaard, June 2015

Notable people 

 Dirk van Hogendorp (1761 in Heenvliet – 1822), Dutch officer and author
 Jan Campert  (1902 in Spijkenisse –  1943) a journalist, theater critic and writer 
 Marleen de Pater-van der Meer (1950 in Hekelingen – 2015) a Dutch politician
 Jan Bechtum (born 1958 in Spijkenisse) a Dutch guitarist and composer
 Erik de Jong (born 1961 in Spijkenisse) known as Spinvis, a Dutch one-man music project
 Medy van der Laan (born 1968 in Spijkenisse) a retired Dutch politician
 Alexander van Oudenaarden (born 1970 in Zuidland) a Dutch biophysicist and systems biologist
 Sied van Riel (born 1978) a Dutch trance music DJ and producer, lives in Spijkenisse
 Björn Franken (born 1983 in Spijkenisse) known as Vato Gonzalez, DJ and producer
 Nick van de Wall (born 1987 in Spijkenisse) known as Afrojack, DJ and producer
 Duncan Laurence (born 1994 in Spijkenisse) singer, winner of the Eurovision Song Contest 2019

Sport 
 Bram Groeneweg (1905 in Spijkenisse – 1988) a Dutch long-distance runner, competed in the marathon at the 1928 Summer Olympics
 Emiel Mellaard (born 1966 in Spijkenisse) is a retired Dutch long jump record holder
 Maarten den Bakker (born 1969 in Abbenbroek) a retired road bicycle racer, competed in the 1988 Summer Olympics
 Joeri de Groot (born 1977 in Spijkenisse) a Dutch rower, competed at the 2004 Summer Olympics
 Patrick van Luijk (born 1984 in Spijkenisse) a Dutch sprinter
 Martijn Barto (born 1984 in Spijkenisse) a Dutch professional footballer with over 200 club caps
 Chanella Stougje (born 1996 in Zuidland) a Dutch professional racing cyclist

References

External links
  (in Dutch)

 
Voorne-Putten
Municipalities of South Holland
Municipalities of the Netherlands established in 2015